The 2019–20 season is Lee Man's 3rd consecutive season in Hong Kong Premier League, the top-tier division in Hong Kong football. Lee Man will compete in the Premier League, Senior Challenge Shield, FA Cup and Sapling Cup this season. Despite their roots in Tseung Kwan O, the club plays its home matches at Sham Shui Po Sports Ground.

Squad

Current squad 
As of 21 September 2020

 
 FP
 FP

 FP

 FP

 FP
 LP

Players' positions as per club's announcement. 
Remarks:
LP These players are considered as local players in Hong Kong domestic football competitions.
FP These players are registered as foreign players.

Transfers

Transfers in

Transfers out

Loans in

Club officials

 Owner: Lee & Man Chemical
 Chairperson: Norman Lee
 Vice Chairperson: Kwok Ching Yee
 Director: Lam Chak Yu
 Head Coach:  Chan Hiu Ming
 Assistant coach:  Tsang Chiu Tat
 Technical Director:  Chan Hung Ping
 Academy Director:  Law Kwok Ho
 First-team goalkeeping coach: Cheng Ho Man
 Fitness coach: Choi Chan In
 Performance analysts: Kwok Chun Lam, Yeung Lok Man

Friendlies

Pre-season

Matches

Table

Hong Kong Premier League

On 14 August 2019, the fixtures for the forthcoming season were announced.

Results by round

Hong Kong Senior Challenge Shield

Hong Kong Sapling Cup

Group stage

Hong Kong FA Cup

Statistics

Appearances
Players with no appearances not included in the list.

Goalscorers
Includes all competitive matches.

Clean sheets

Disciplinary record

Remarks

References

Lee Man FC seasons
Hong Kong football clubs 2019–20 season